Ariel Mauricio Rojas (born 16 January 1986 in Garín, Argentina) is a football midfielder who plays for Belgrano.

Career

Rojas began his professional playing career with Vélez Sársfield of the Primera División. He made his league debut as a substitute on 26 August 2007 in a 4-2 home win against Gimnasia y Esgrima de Jujuy. He made only 3 appearances for Vélez, all as a substitute.

In 2008, he joined 2nd division side Godoy Cruz and was part of the team that secured promotion to the Primera División at the end of the 2007-08 season. Rojas scored his first goal in professional football on 13 September 2009 in a 1-1 draw against Huracán.

Career statistics

Club

Honours

River Plate
Argentina Primera Division: 2014 Final
Copa Sudamericana: 2014
Recopa Sudamericana: 2015
Copa Libertadores: 2015

References

External links
 
 
 Ariel Rojas – Argentine Primera statistics at Fútbol XXI  
 

1986 births
Living people
Sportspeople from Buenos Aires Province
Argentine footballers
Argentine expatriate footballers
Association football midfielders
Argentine Primera División players
Liga MX players
Club Atlético Vélez Sarsfield footballers
Godoy Cruz Antonio Tomba footballers
Cruz Azul footballers
Club Atlético River Plate footballers
San Lorenzo de Almagro footballers
Atlético Tucumán footballers
Central Córdoba de Santiago del Estero footballers
Club Atlético Belgrano footballers
Expatriate footballers in Mexico
Argentine expatriate sportspeople in Mexico